Harrow bus station serves the town of Harrow in the London Borough of Harrow, Greater London, England. The station is owned and maintained by Transport for London.

The bus station is on College Road situated approximately 100 metres away from Harrow-on-the-Hill rail and tube stations. The bus station is also across the road from the St Ann's Shopping Centre.

There are five stands within the bus station. The main operators at the bus station are London Sovereign, Metroline and Arriva London.

Buses go from Harrow as far afield as Watford, Ealing, Edgware, Brent Cross, Golders Green, Wembley, Heathrow Airport, Ruislip, Northolt, Greenford, Charing Cross (Night Bus), Bushey Heath and Northwood.

History 
An official opening ceremony was held on 27 May 1981, attended by the chairman of London Transport and the Mayor of Harrow. It was built at a cost of £865,000. The bus station opened to the public on 30 May.

Vandalism was a major problem for the bus station. In April 1988, London Regional Transport announced that they had commissioned an architect to examine the bus station and recommend changes to counter vandalism. The bus station reopened on 27 June 1993 following a four month refurbishment.

See also
List of bus and coach stations in London

References 

Bus stations in London
Transport in the London Borough of Harrow